The Progressive Conservative Party of Manitoba (previously known as the Conservative Party of Manitoba) has had several contested races to determine its leadership.  These have all occurred by voting at delegated conventions.  The results are listed below.

1919 Conservative leadership convention
(Held on November 6, 1919)

R.G. Willis winner
Fawcett Taylor

(Note:  The vote totals were not read into the record.)

1922 Conservative leadership convention
(Held on April 5, 1922)

Fawcett Taylor winner
John Thomas Haig

(Note:  The results were not announced.  R.G. Willis was nominated as a candidate, but declined.)

1936 Conservative leadership convention
(Held on June 9, 1936)

Errick Willis acclaimed

1950 Progressive Conservative leadership challenge
(Held in October, 1950)

Errick Willis 188
George Hastings 45

1954 Progressive Conservative leadership challenge
(Held on June 17, 1954)

First ballot:

Errick Willis 118
Dufferin Roblin 114
J. Arthur Ross 55

Second ballot (Ross eliminated):

Dufferin Roblin 160
Errick Willis 123

1967 Progressive Conservative leadership convention
(Held on November 25, 1967)

First ballot:

Walter Weir 167
Sterling Lyon 141
Stewart McLean 87
George Johnson 71

Second ballot (Johnson eliminated):

Walter Weir 220
Sterling Lyon 170
Stewart McLean 73

Third ballot (McLean eliminated):

Walter Weir 280
Sterling Lyon 183

1971 Progressive Conservative leadership convention
(Held on February 27, 1971)

Sidney Spivak 261
Harry Enns 215

1975 Progressive Conservative leadership convention
(Held on December 6, 1975)

Sterling Lyon 264
Sidney Spivak 207

1983 Progressive Conservative leadership convention
(Held on December 10, 1983)

First ballot:

Gary Filmon 261
Brian Ransom 217
Clayton Manness 71
	
Second ballot (Manness eliminated):

Gary Filmon 297
Brian Ransom 251

2000 Progressive Conservative leadership convention
(Held on November 4, 2000)

Stuart Murray acclaimed

(Note:  Darren Praznik had previously withdrawn.)

2006 Progressive Conservative leadership convention

(Held on April 29, 2006 by one member one vote) 

Hugh McFadyen 6,091
Ron Schuler 1,953
Ken Waddell 1,099

2012 Progressive Conservative leadership convention
(Held on July 30, 2012)

Brian Pallister acclaimed

2021 Progressive Conservative leadership convention

(Held on October 30, 2021)

Heather Stefanson 8,405
Shelly Glover 8,042

Progressive Conservative